This page documents the tornadoes and tornado outbreaks of 2002, primarily in the United States. Most tornadoes form in the U.S., although some events may take place internationally. The year had several large outbreaks that included the Veterans Day Weekend tornado outbreak and the Midwest to Mid-Atlantic United States tornado outbreak.

Synopsis

The Tornado Season of 2002 was a below average season with only 934 tornadoes touching down, However, this season had its two largest outbreaks occurring early in the year and late in the year because of cold fronts being able to create favorable conditions for tornadic activity in the United States.

Events

January
There were three tornadoes confirmed in the US in January.

February
There were two tornadoes confirmed in the US in February.

March
There were 47 tornadoes confirmed in the US in March.

March 24
A rare 30 yard wide F0 tornado formed in Hawaii at 6:55 PM, doing $60,000 in damage.

April
There were 117 tornadoes confirmed in the US in April.

April 24
An F4 tornado touched down in Missouri, killing nobody.

April 27–28

This fairly large tornado outbreak killed 6 people and inflicted ≥$224 million (2002 USD) of damage to the states of Illinois, Indiana, Kentucky, Maryland, New York, Ohio, Pennsylvania, Tennessee, Virginia, West Virginia, Iowa, Kansas, Missouri, and Nebraska. It caused some hail damage to crops and houses as well.

May
There were 204 tornadoes confirmed in the US in May.

May 5
34 tornadoes touchdown in US, including 19 in Texas. Three tornadoes were rated F2, including a dust filled wedge tornado that struck Happy, Texas and a killer tornado.

May 7
21 tornadoes were reported, including 17 in Kansas, with three of the tornadoes reached F3 intensity. A long-tracked F2 tornado also prompted a tornado emergency in Pratt, Kansas, but there were no fatalities.

May 20 (Hong Kong)
A weak tornado struck Hong Kong International Airport.

June
There were 97 tornadoes confirmed in the US in June.

June 23

A localized outbreak of eight tornadoes struck the Dakotas over a period of only 93 minutes. One supercell thunderstorm spawned six tornadoes in Brown County, South Dakota. One was an F3 tornado that destroyed at least one home. Another was an F4 tornado that occurred four miles east of Barnard, South Dakota and destroyed a pheasant farm. There were no deaths or significant injuries with the storm. The storm was documented by at least one storm chasing team, and was featured on an episode of The Weather Channel's "Storm Stories."

July
There were 68 tornadoes confirmed in the US in July.

July 28
A brief F1 tornado impacted Mottville, New York, which caused $2 million (2002 USD) in damage.

August
There were 86 tornadoes confirmed in the US in August.

August 11
An F4 tornado touched down in North Dakota, injuring or killing nobody.

September
There were 61 tornadoes confirmed in the US in September.

September 2
At approximately 4:20 PM CDT, an F3 tornado tore through the town of Ladysmith, Wisconsin, causing $25 million in damage.  27 people were injured but nobody was killed.  The twister had a path of 16 miles, and was one of six to touchdown in Wisconsin that day.

September 20
An F3 tornado in Indiana became one of the longest tracked tornadoes in the state's history after it formed along a squall line and tracked 112 miles from near Ellettsville in Monroe County to northeast of Hartford City in Blackford County. A tornado emergency was issued for Marion County as the tornado passed very close to Indianapolis. The tornado injured 127 people, but none were killed.

October
There were 58 tornadoes confirmed in the US in October.

November
There were 96 tornadoes confirmed in the US in November.

November 9–11

 
The Veterans Day outbreak was an unseasonably strong and destructive severe weather event that spawned 83 tornadoes in 36 hours across a widespread swath in the Central and Eastern United States. It was the second largest tornado outbreak on record in November and also among the deadliest, killing 36 people.

December
There were 99 tornadoes confirmed in the US in December.

December 17–19
A severe weather event spawned 48 tornadoes across a widespread swath in the Central and southern United States. On December 17, a long-track F2 tornado killed 2 people and also badly damaged the Lucky Lady Trailer Park near Springfield, MO. Tornadic activity peaked on December 18 when 39 tornadoes occurred, including an F3 tornado that passed near the town of Hamlet and destroyed several permanent and mobile homes, resulting in a fatality. Tornadic activity concluded on the 19th with 6 tornadoes, including an F2 tornado in Mississippi which resulted in no casualties.

December 23–24
An unseasonably strong severe weather event spawned 48 weak tornadoes in 43 hours across a widespread swath in the Southern United States.

December 30–January 1, 2003
A line of storms spawned 13 tornadoes.

See also
 Weather of 2002
 Tornado
 Tornadoes by year
 Tornado records
 Tornado climatology
 Tornado myths
 List of tornado outbreaks
 List of F5 and EF5 tornadoes
 List of F4 and EF4 tornadoes
 List of North American tornadoes and tornado outbreaks
 List of 21st-century Canadian tornadoes and tornado outbreaks
 List of European tornadoes and tornado outbreaks
 List of tornadoes and tornado outbreaks in Asia
 List of Southern Hemisphere tornadoes and tornado outbreaks
 List of tornadoes striking downtown areas
 List of tornadoes with confirmed satellite tornadoes
 Tornado intensity
 Fujita scale
 Enhanced Fujita scale
 International Fujita scale
 TORRO scale

References

External links 
 U.S. tornadoes in 2002 – Tornado History Project
 Tornado Project tornadoes of 2002
 Storm Data "2002 Annual Summaries" (NCDC)

 
2002 meteorology
Tornado-related lists by year
2002-related lists